Soyka Saddle (‘Sedlovina Soyka’ \se-dlo-vi-'na 'soy-ka\) is the ice-covered saddle of elevation 1250 m connecting Ravelin Ridge and Urda Ridge on Clarence Island in the South Shetland Islands, Antarctica.  It is situated between Mount Llana on the southwest and Jerez Peak on the north-northeast, and surmounts Highton Glacier to the east.

The saddle is named after the settlements of Soyka in Southern Bulgaria.

Location
British mapping in 1972 and 2009.

Maps
British Antarctic Territory. Scale 1:200000 topographic map. DOS 610 Series, Sheet W 61 54. Directorate of Overseas Surveys, Tolworth, UK, 1972.
South Shetland Islands: Elephant, Clarence and Gibbs Islands. Scale 1:220000 topographic map. UK Antarctic Place-names Committee, 2009.
 Antarctic Digital Database (ADD). Scale 1:250000 topographic map of Antarctica. Scientific Committee on Antarctic Research (SCAR). Since 1993, regularly upgraded and updated.

References
 Bulgarian Antarctic Gazetteer. Antarctic Place-names Commission. (details in Bulgarian, basic data in English)
Soyka Saddle. SCAR Composite Gazetteer of Antarctica.

External links
 Soyka Saddle. Copernix satellite image

Mountain passes of the South Shetland Islands
Bulgaria and the Antarctic